Glen Finnan is a glen (valley) in Lochaber, Highland, Scotland, located at the foot of Streap in the Northwest Highlands mountain range. The River Finnan, which flows into Loch Shiel, flows the entire length of the valley. The Sgùrr Thuilm mountain stands at the head of Glen Finnan.

References 

Glens of Scotland
Valleys of Highland (council area)